Anushavan is a village in the Artik Municipality of the Shirak Province of Armenia. In 1969, the town was renamed in honor of Dr. Anushavan Galoyan, a World War II hero. The Statistical Committee of Armenia reported its population was 2,185 in 2010, up from 1,983 at the 2001 census.

Demographics

References 

Communities in Shirak Province
Populated places in Shirak Province